Barry Goodingham (born 9 May 1945) was a regular first ruckman for the North Melbourne Football Club and South Melbourne in the Victorian Football League (VFL) during the late 1960s and early 1970s.

Nicknamed 'Lurch', due to his resemblance to the butler in the television sitcom The Addams Family, he captained North Melbourne in 1971.

Recruited from Edithvale-Aspendale, he was selected in North Melbourne's first Premiership team in 1975, but appeared only briefly to replace Mick Nolan late in the last quarter. He enjoys a life membership of the North Melbourne Football Club.

Goodingham finished his VFL career with a two-year stint at South Melbourne, traded in a deal that sent Peter Keenan to North Melbourne. He then went to South Australia and played for three years for Woodville, the last two as playing coach.

References

External links 
 
 

North Melbourne Football Club players
North Melbourne Football Club Premiership players
Sydney Swans players
Woodville Football Club players
Woodville Football Club coaches
Australian rules footballers from Victoria (Australia)
1945 births
Living people
One-time VFL/AFL Premiership players